Dunsum (Fering: Dunsem) is a municipality located on the western shore of Föhr in the district of Nordfriesland, in Schleswig-Holstein, Germany. It is composed of the districts of Greater and Lesser Dunsum.

Geography and traffic
From Dunsum, guided mudflat hikes to the neighbouring island of Amrum are offered at low tide. Amrum and Sylt can be seen from there. In the tidal flats north of the village the Baalkstian is located, a large glacial erratic, which was destroyed during a storm surge. The tale has it, that a treasure is hidden below the rock, yet it has never been found.

Bus lines connect Dunsum to the other villages of the island and to the town of Wyk auf Föhr.

History

The name means "Donni's settlement".

In the 17th and 18th century, whaling was an important trade on Föhr. A census in 1787 showed that Dunsum had 147 inhabitants, 40 of whom were seafarers.

As a part of Westerland Föhr, Dunsum belonged to the Royal Enclaves of Denmark and thus was a direct part of the Danish crown while Osterland Föhr belonged to the duchy of Schleswig. Only when Denmark lost Schleswig to Prussia in the Second Schleswig War, Dunsum became a part of Schleswig-Holstein.

Politics
Since the communal elections of 2008 the Dunsumer Wählergemeinschaft holds all seven seats of the municipality council.

References

External links
Dunsum

Municipalities in Schleswig-Holstein
Föhr
Nordfriesland